Aijalon Carlton "A.C." Cordoza (born 1989) is an American politician from Virginia. He was first elected to the Virginia House of Delegates in 2021, defeating incumbent Democratic Delegate Martha Mugler. Cordoza represents the 91st district, which covers a large slice of Hampton, as well as all of the neighboring city of Poquoson, and a small slice of neighboring York County.

Early life 
Aijalon Cordoza was born in New York City, and grew up in Hampton, Virginia. In 2008, he graduated from Hampton High School; in 2013, he joined the United States Air Force, in which he served for three years before leaving honorably.

Cordoza began attending Thomas Nelson Community College in Hampton in 2014, graduating in 2016 with an associate degree in information technology. Cordoza has since become a cybersecurity professional at Newport News Shipbuilding. He lives in Hampton.

Career 
He became interested in politics during the 2008 presidential election due to "the possibility of the nation electing the first black President". After the election, Cordoza decided his beliefs were more aligned with the Republican Party, despite his past support for Barack Obama. He has become vice-chair of the Hampton Republican Party.

2020 Hampton City Council election 
In 2020, Cordoza ran for the Hampton City Council, his first election. He lost, coming in fifth (the top three finishers became city councilors), with 9.8% of the vote.

2021 Virginia House of Delegates election 
In 2021, Cordoza ran for Virginia's 91st House of Delegates district and defeated incumbent first-term Democrat Martha Mugler by just 94 votes, with 49.4% of the vote to Mugler's 49.0%. After a recount the final count ended up with Cordoza winning by 64 votes.

Electoral history

References

External links 
 Campaign website

Living people
Politicians from Hampton, Virginia
21st-century American politicians
Republican Party members of the Virginia House of Delegates
21st-century African-American politicians
African-American state legislators in Virginia
1989 births